The Meng is a river of Voralberg, Austria.

It originates near the Naafkopf mountain. It flows through the valley  in a northern direction. At the municipality of Nenzing, it discharges into the Ill.

The Gampbach, a river of  length, flows from the right side into the middle section of the Meng.

References

Rivers of Vorarlberg
Rivers of Austria